PJSC may refer to:
 Joint-stock company, a type of business entity
 Pantai Jerudong Specialist Centre, a specialist hospital in Brunei
 PJSC Aeroflot – Russian Airlines, commonly known as Aeroflot